A list of films produced in Pakistan in 1956 (see 1956 in film) and in the Urdu language:

1956

See also
1956 in Pakistan

External links
 Search Pakistani film - IMDB.com

1956
Pakistani
Films